Linstock is a village in the civil parish of Stanwix Rural, in the Carlisle District, in the county of Cumbria, England. It is a few miles away from the city of Carlisle and near the River Eden.  Circa 1870, it had a population of 205 as recorded in the Imperial Gazetteer of England and Wales.

Nearby settlements 
Nearby settlements include the commuter village of Houghton and the hamlets of Brunstock, Walby, Park Broom and Whiteclosegate.

Transport 
For transport there is the B6264 road, the A689 road and the M6 motorway nearby, there is a bridge going over the M6 motorway called Linstock Bridge. There is also the Carlisle railway station a few miles away, which is on the Settle-Carlisle Line.

Landmarks 
Linstock Castle, now a farmhouse, was formerly a tower house built in the 12th or early 13th century as a palace for the Bishops of Carlisle, with 17th-20th century additions and alterations.

Half a mile to the west, beside the M6, Drawdykes Castle is a former pele tower, converted to a house with a Classical Revival facade in 1676.

See also

Listed buildings in Stanwix Rural

References

External links 
 Cumbria County History Trust: Stanwix (nb: provisional research only – see Talk page)

Hamlets in Cumbria
City of Carlisle